João Francisco Ferreira Delgado (born 15 September 1994) is a Portuguese footballer who plays as a midfielder for FC Tucson in USL League One.

Career

Early career
Delgado played as part of the academy at União Leiria, before going on to spend time with various clubs in the third-tier of Portuguese football between 2013 and 2016.

College & Amateur
In 2016, Delgado moved to the United States to play college soccer at Bluefield College in Virginia. In two seasons with the Rams, Delgado made 37 appearances, scoring 21 goals and tallying 5 assists. He was also named Soccer Coaches First Team All-American, finished third in the Appalachian Athletic Conference in goals, and ranked second in the nation in game-winning goals during his junior year of collegiate play.

Delgado also played one season at Lynn University in Florida in 2019. Here he made 19 appearances and finished with 2 assists, as well as Second Team All-SSC honors.

During his time in the United States, Delgado also played in the USL League Two for Myrtle Beach Mutiny and Reading United AC.

FC Tucson
On 17 February 2021, Delgado signed with USL League One side FC Tucson. He made his debut for Tucson on 8 May 2021, appearing as an 86th-minute substitute during a 1–1 draw with Forward Madison. He score his first goal for the club on 16 May 2021, the club's only goal during a 5–1 loss to Fort Lauderdale CF.

References

External links
Joao Delgado - Men's Soccer at Lynn University
Joao Delgado at FC Tucson

1994 births
Living people
People from Torres Novas
Association football midfielders
Portuguese footballers
Portuguese expatriate footballers
Portuguese expatriate sportspeople in the United States
Expatriate soccer players in the United States
U.D. Leiria players
Eléctrico F.C. players
A.C. Alcanenense players
Lynn Fighting Knights men's soccer players
Myrtle Beach Mutiny players
Reading United A.C. players
FC Tucson players
Campeonato de Portugal (league) players
USL League One players
USL League Two players
Sportspeople from Santarém District